Cytora calva is a species of very small land snails with an operculum, terrestrial gastropod molluscs in the family Pupinidae.

Distribution 
This species occur in New Zealand.

References

 Bruce A. Marshall, Molluscan and brachiopod taxa introduced by F. W. Hutton in The New Zealand journal of science; Journal of the Royal Society of New Zealand, Volume 25, Issue 4, 1995

Pupinidae
Gastropods of New Zealand